In 2008, the European Parliament introduced the European Citizen's prize. It is intended to reward on an annual basis individuals or groups who have particularly distinguished themselves in strengthening European integration by the expression of European cooperation, openness to others and practical involvement in the development of mutual understanding. It is awarded upon nominations of Members of European Parliament.

The Prize
The European Citizen's Prize was launched by the European Parliament in 2008 to recognise exceptional achievements by Europeans. In that year, 37 people from 19 member states were selected for the prize in recognition of relevant work done. They received their medals in national award ceremonies and had the chance to showcase their work and meet MEPs at the European Parliament in Brussels on 7–8 November. The awarding of the European Citizen's Prize has continued annually since then, with some projects being linked to the theme of the European year, a specific area of focus which changes every year. The Citizen's Prize may be given for activities that either facilitate cross-border cooperation within the EU or promote better mutual understanding and closer integration between citizens and member states. It may also be awarded for day-to-day activities reflecting the values enshrined in the EU's charter of fundamental rights. The laureates can be citizens, groups, associations or organisations. Every year each MEP has the right to nominate one candidate.

2008 winners 
 Santiago SÁNCHEZ-AGUSTINO RODRÍGUEZ
 José María MUÑOA GANUZA
 Associação Nacional de Municípios Portugueses
 Kärntner Konsensgruppe
 Duna TV|Duna Televízió
 Verein zur Förderung des Städtepartnerschaft Leipzig-Travnik
 Lajos OSZLARI
 AEDE-Canarias
 Unrepresented Nations and Peoples Organization (UNPO)
 Polska Akcja Humanitarna
 Naturpark Bayerischer Wald e.V.
 Divadlo z Pasáže
 Jochen GEWECKE
 Towarzystwo Bambrów Poznańskich
 Bürger Europas
 Federação de Associações de Juventude dos Açores
 Πυροσβεστικό Σώμα Ελλάδος
 Europees Musikfestival voor de Jeugd
 Francisca Sauquillo Pérez del Arco
 Campus 15
 Franz-Josef MEYER
 Grażyna ORLOWSKA-SONDEJ
 Donaubüro-Ulm
 Kolpingjugend Europa
 Ulla RÜDENHOLZ
 Jean Pierre DAULOUEDE
 Susanna LIPOVAC und Kinderberg International e.V.
 Amministratori del Comune di Lula 2002-2007
 Kolegium Europy Wschodniej im. Jana Nowaka-Jeziorańskiego
 Santiago SÁNCHEZ-AGUSTINO RODRÍGUEZ
 Tomasz RÓŻNIAK
 Wojciech WRZESIŃSKI
 Raissa MURUMETS
 Emberi Jogi KÖZPONT
 Michael NIELSEN
 Luigi Ciotti
 G700 Blog
 Oud Limburgse Schuttersfederatie

2010 winners
 Jugendhilfsorganisation Schüler Helfen Leben
 Międzynarodowy Festiwal Filmów Młodego Widza Ale Kino!
 Ing. Wolfgang NEUMANN
 Margit Ricarda Rolf - Mobbing-Zentrale - Germany
 Union européenne des étudiants juifs
 Csaba Böjte
 Lothar CZOSSEK
 Fate VELAJ
 Elżbieta LECH-GOTTHARD
 Carlo Petrini
 Inicjatywa Wolna Białoruś
 Fundacja Świętego Mikołaja
 Open Society Foundations
 Stowarzyszenie „Jeden Świat”
 Europ'age Saar-Lor-Lux e.V
 Sermig-Servizio Missionario Giovani
 Europees Grenslanden Vrouwenvoetbal Toernooi
 Stowarzyszenie Lednica 2000
 Chris DELICATA
 Enrico Pieri
 Jacques GROFFEN
 Beneluxliga handbal
 INΣΤΙΤΟΥΤΟ ΟΔΙΚΗΣ ΑΣΦΑΛΕΙΑΣ «ΠΑΝΟΣ ΜΥΛΩΝΑΣ»
 Smaranda ENACHE
 EYV 2011 Alliance
 Fondazione Banco Alimentare
 Polska Fundacja im. Roberta Schumana
 Zsuzsa Ferge
 Hans BIENFAIT
 Marek SOŁTYS

2012 winners
 Albergo Etico
 Arbeitskreis Schule Rhauderfehn e. V.
 Biagio Conte (missionario)|Biagio Conte
 Congresso Ibérico de Jovens Engenheiros
 Colours of Carinthia — Franz Tomazic (Projektleitung für die Personengruppe), Karlheinz FESSL, Christian BRANDSTÄTTER, Erich KUGI, Lojze WIESER
 DEFRIT
 Deutsch-Französische Gesellschaft Montabaur e.V.
 Dr. Christoph Leitl 
 ΕΛΛΗΝΙΚΗ ΕΤΑΙΡΕΙΑ Περιβάλλοντος και Πολιτισμού
 Ekipa projekta Simbioz@
 Eurofeesten Geel 2012
 Europäische Vereinigung für Eifel und Ardennen
 Giovanni RIEFOLO
 Gisela PATERKIEWICZ
 Jacek ŁUCZAK
 Jeunes Européens — France
 Kató Béla, református lelkész, püspökhelyettes
 Latvijas Lauku sieviešu apvienība, padomes priekšsēdētāja, Rasma Freimane
 Lovro Šturm
 Mgr. Victor GRECH
 Μουσικό Εργαστήρι "ΛΑΒΥΡΙΝΘΟΣ"
 PassodopoPasso
 Paul BRUSSON
 Петър Петров, България (Peter Petrov, Bulgaria)
 Πέτρος ΣΟΥΠΠΟΥΡHΣ και Huseyin AKANSOY
 Polska Federacja Ruchów Obrony Życia
 Róka GYULA
 Sophie ROSSEELS
 Stichting Werkgroep Polen
 Stolperstein
 Stowarzyszenie św. Celestyna
 Stowarzyszenie WIOSNA
 Symon KLIMAN
 Szekely JANOS
 UNITALSI
 Vanhustyön keskusliitto — Centralförbundet för de gamlas väl ry
 Vencer o Tempo, Associação para a Educação e Prevenção da Saúde

2013 winners
 Alicja Kobus
 Biruta Eglīte
 Boris Pahor
 Children’s International Summer Villages (CISV International)
 Daniel Vogelmann, publisher
 Д-р Милен Врабевски, председател на Фондация Българска Памет
 Dr. Klaus Wilkens
 Elke Jeanrond-Premauer
 Eugenia Bonetti, Presidente 'Slaves No More Onlus', missionaria della Consolata, coordinatrice Ufficio Tratta Donne e Minori dell'USMI
 Euregioschool: leren van de buurtaal door en voor uitwisseling
 Lobby européen des femmes
 Gábor Farkas
 GAA Cumann Lúthchleas Gael
 Hans Zohren
 Heikki Huttunen/Suomen Ekumeeninen Neuvosto
 Hela Sverige ska leva
 Ioana Avadani
 Jacek Glomb
 Junge Europäische Bewegung
 Kuoreveden nuorisoseura Nysäry
 Mag.a (FH) Ursula Kapfenberger-Poindl, DI Hermann Hansy, Karl G Becker, DI Reinhard M. Weitzer, DI Andreas Weiß (allesamt Regionalmanager in Niederösterreich)
 Matthias Zürl
 Mehmet Emin Eminoglu & Άντρια Κυπριανού
 Εθνικό Κέντρο Άμεσης Βοήθειας (EKAB) Κρήτης
 Nistor Elena
 Plataforma Afectados por la Hipoteca
 Professor Richard Demarco
 Puttinu Cares Children`s Cancer Support Group
 Raoul Wallenberg Egyesület
 Real Academia de la Lengua Vasca – Euskaltzaindia
 Associazione "Avvocato di strada" (Street Lawyers) ONLUS
 
 Teatr Arka
 Ośrodek 'Brama Grodzka - Teatr NN'
 The AIRE Centre
 Urmo Kübar (Executive Director, Network of Estonian Nonprofit Organizations)
 Г-н Валери Нисимов Петров
 Valeriu Nicolae
 Association Vents et marées
 Via Euregio
 Working Together (représentée par M. Laurent Rouillon)
 Youthnet Hellas www.youthnet.gr 
 ZZI - Zentrum der zeitgemäßen Initiativen Austria

2014 winners
 Prof. Anna Wolff-Powęska
 Alojz Rebula
 Andrei Pleşu
 atlatszo.hu
 Dr Bartłomiej Zapała
 BEDNET
 Blue Star Programme
 Bulli Tour Europa
 Cittadini di Lampedusa
 Cocina Economica de Logroño
 Comhaltas Ceoltóirí Éireann
 Demokratisches Ostvorpommern – Verein für politische Kultur e.V.
 Διογένης ΜΚΟ
 Erika Körner-Metz und Gisela Berninger
 Eurodionantes
 Europäische Gesellschaft für Politik, Kultur, Soziales e.V. Diaphania
 EuropeanMigrationLaw
 MUDr. Eva Siracká, DrSc., prezidentka Ligy proti rakovine
 Evropský parlament mládeže v ČR
 Fundacja Pomocy Wzajemnej „Barka”
 Христо Христов
 Jaccede
 Je veux l'Europe
 Kerényi Lajos
 Κέντρο Εκπαιδεύσεως & Αποκαταστάσεως Τυφλών, Περιφερειακή Διεύθυνση Θεσσαλονίκης (πρώην Σχολή Τυφλών Θεσσαλονίκης «Ο ΗΛΙΟΣ»)
 Libera. Associazioni, nomi e numeri contro le mafie
 Malta Hospice Movement
 Maria De Biase
 Marianne Lück
 Martina Čuljak - HelpBalkans
 Mauthausen Komitee Österreich
 Miljötinget
 Младите доброволци от Варна
 Nadace Naše Dítě
 Orden Hospitalaria de San Juan de Dios
 Probstner János
 Sevgül Uludağ και Μιχάλης Χριστοφίδης
 Skills Belgium
 Societat Civil Catalana
 Societatea Timişoara
 SOS SCUOLA di ALVEARE CINEMA
 SOSERM SOS Emergenza Rifugiati Milano
 Spomenka Hribar
 Το χαμόγελο του παιδιού
 Verein.Respekt.net
 Werner Hohlbein, „Wir sitzen alle in einem Boot für mehr Toleranz“
 Wiener Volkshochschulen "Women on the Rise"

2015 winners
 Antoine Deltour
 Carole Roberts
 Člověk v tísni
 Davide Martello
 Davidovics László
 Die gewollte Donau
 Don Michele De Paolis (EMMAUS)
 Drago Jančar
 Eva Siracká
 Euriade e.V.
 Fundación Barraquer
 Fundacja Integracji Społecznej PROM
 Fundacja Oswoić Los
 Gaia Ferrara
 Gemeinsam leben und lernen in Europa e.V.
 Stichting Heart for Romania
 Hrvatska gorska služba spašavanja
 Ikäihmisten olohuone
 Innovaction
 Instituto Marquês de Valle Flôr
 Istituto di Medicina Solidale Onlus
 Katri Raik
 Κοινωνική Κουζίνα - ο Άλλος  Άνθρωπος
 La Ciudad Accesible
 Asociacija „Lietuvos neįgaliųjų forumas“
 Lydia Foy
 Maria Manuela Ramalho Eanes
 Mário João de Oliveira Ruivo
 Medici con l'Africa CUAMM
 Miskolci Speciális Felderítő és Mentőcsoport
 Μητροπολιτικό Κοινωνικό Ιατρείο Ελληνικού
 Netzwerk sozialer Zusammenhalt
 Народно читалище „Бъдеще сега 2006"
 PAMINA Nachwuchsschwimmfest
 PhDr. Marek Hrubec, PhD.
 Rafel Shamri
 Richmond Foundation
 Romska Ungdomsförbundet
 Rūta Dimanta
 Schone Kleren Campagne
 Serge Laborderie
 SLYNCS
 Τάκης Χατζηδημτρίου και Ali Tuncay
 Territoires de la Mémoire
 Tessy Fautsch
 Tina Ellen Lee
 Tomo Križnar
 Yves D. Robert

2016 winners
 ADRA Česká republika
 Dennis ARVANITAKIS
 Asociacija «Medardo Čoboto Trečiojo amžiaus universitetas»
 Associazione Pegaso
 BALAZS Major
 Aleksandra BANASIAK
 Iordan Gheorghe BĂRBULESCU
 Evgen Angel BAVČAR
 Berufliches Schulzentrum Wurzen; Frau Gabriele Hertel
 Citizens UK
 Citoyennes pour l’Europe
 Coder Dojo
 Conselho Nacional de Juventude
 Csemadokot (Szlovákiai Magyar Társadalmi és Közművelődési Szövetség)
 Dar il-Kaptan
 Sener ELCIL
 ENDSTATION RECHTS.
 Euro-Chess Foundation
 Fondazione Arché Onlus
 Frauen in der Euregio Maas-Rhein
 Fundusz Lokalny Masywu Śnieżnika
 Paul GALLES
 Gautena
 Ομάδα 40 μαθητών από το λύκειο Αποστόλου Λουκά, Κολλοσίου (Group of 40 children from St Luke’s High School, Colossi, Limassol)
 Humanitarna udruga fra Mladen Hrkać
 Internet Watch Foundation (IWF)
 Dr Barbara Helen KNOWLES
 KOZMA Imre
 Menschen im Marchfeld (MiM)
 Mobile School
 Κίνηση Συνύπαρξης και Επικοινωνίας στο Αιγαίο (Movement Coexistence and Communication at Sea)
 Ivan NIKOLOV (Иван Николов)
 ONCE
 Opera per la Gioventù «Giorgio La Pira»
 Mariana PENCHEVA (Мариана Пенчева)
 Perpetuum Mobile ry/Artist at Risk
 Positive Voice
Dita PŘIKRYLOVÁ
 Proactiva Open Arms
 Pushing
 Alexandre SCHON
 SOS MÉDITERRANÉE
 Nawal Soufi
 Stiftelsen Expo
 Stowarzyszenie Komitet Obrony Demokracji
 Sur les pas d’Albert Londres
 Tiago PITTA E CUNHA
 Vluchtelingenwerk Nederland
 Erwin VOLLERTHUS
 David VSEVIOV

2017 winners 
 Αικατερίνη Παναγοπούλου
 Αμερίκος Αργυρίου
 Антони Стоянов 
 Agence de Développement rural Europe et Territoires
 Border Communities against Brexit
 Μπορούμε
 Brexpats - Hear our voice
 Bürger Europas
 Buscant Alternatives
 CERMI (Comité español de representantes de personas con discapacidad)
 Charita Česká Republika
 Cristian Pantazi
 Davide Sousa Moura
 Don Virginio Rigoldi
 Ewa Dados
 Fondazione Opera Immacolata Concezione ONLUS
 Foróige 
 Għaqda Każini tal-Banda
 "Glaskunst langs de Maas" van Stichting Ecrevissecomité Obbicht
 Hej Främling!
 Herta Hoffmann
 Hope for girls
 Hrvatska udruga Transplant
 Ján Benčík
 Junge Aktion der Ackermann-Gemeinde
 Labdarības maratona “Dod Pieci” komanda
 Lietuvos moterų lobistinė organizacija
 Mazowieckie Stowarzyszenie Pracy dla Niepełnosprawnych „De Facto” 
 Médecins du monde - Belgique
 Mihály Bencze
 Mosaik
 Mouvement du Nid / Délégation du Bas-Rhin
 Pescatori siciliani di Mazara del Vallo
 Plataforma de afectados por Hepatitis C
 Plataforma de Apoio aos Refugiados
 PRAKSIS
 Pulse of Europe
 Robert Hébras
 Saint-Omer Cricket Club Stars
 SámiSoster ry
 Stowarzyszenie Drogami Tischnera 
 Strom života
 Students and Refugees Together (START) - Avril Bellinger
 Széll Tamás
 Szilárd István
 Teeme Ära
 Teresa de Sousa
 Tvrtko Barun 
 #VORREIPRENDEREILTRENO ONLUS
 ZDUS - Zveza društev upokojencev Slovenije

2018 winners 
 Alicja Szatkowska
 Αντρέας Μάτσης/Okan Dugli (Bi-communal Famagusta Initiative)
 Άνεμος ανανέωσης 
 António Pinto Monteiro
 Antonio Silvio Caló
 Архимандрит Партений Фидановски
 Bjorn Formosa
 Čebelarska zveza Slovenije
 Centre Mondial de la Paix
 Dmitri Rõbakov
 Don Virginio Colmegna
 Ehrenamtlicher Dolmetscherdienst der Stadt Ludwigsburg
 Eurooppanuoret ry
 Fatta!
 Fo.B.A.P. ONLUS
 Förderverein der Sozialklinik Kalamata
 Fundação Francisco Manuel dos Santos
 Fundació Arrels
 HOPEgenesis 
 Hrvatski ured za kreativnost i inovacije
 HUMAIN Vzw/asbl 
 Iespējamā misija 
 Inner City Helping Homeless
 Institut für Erinnerungskultur 2.0 NeverForgetWhy
 Irish Men's Sheds Association
 J.C.A. Akerboom
 Κιβωτός του κόσμου 
 La Maison des Femmes de Saint-Denis
 Laurent Festas
 MagiCAMP
 Matthäus Weiß , 1. Landesvorsitzender und der Verband Deutscher Sinti und Roma e.V. Landesverband Schleswig-Holstein
 Mihai Sora
 Nagycsaládosok Országos Egyesülete (NOE)
 Odile Linden
 Paola Scagnelli
 Pierre Maurice
 Plateforme citoyenne de soutien aux réfugiés
 Polish Jews Forum
 Post Bellum
 Pražský studentský summit 
 Proyecto Integra de la Fundación Universidad Camilo José Cela
 Refugees Welcome Crawley
 Σενέρ Λεβέντ
 Spirit of Football e.V.
 Stichting De Aldenborgh
 Švento Jokūbo Kelio Savivaldybių Asociacija
 Szvorák Katalin
 Unidad de Gestión Clínica de Medicina Maternofetal, Genética y Reproducción (UGCMFG) del Hospital Universitario Virgen del Rocío
 Varga Erika
 Wielka Orkiestra Świątecznej Pomocy

2020 winners 

- Paraplü

- EuroBabble

- Generation Climate Europe

- Medea/ Snezhina Petrova, Legal Art Centre

- See Through Music/ Melina Krumoa, Foundation "Music for Bulgaria"

- BORANKA (PAINT IT BACK)

- Social Mediation in Practice (ICLAIM)

- Culture meets volunteerisim (Kostas Vichas)

- CIIRC CTU Czech Institute of Informatics, Robotics, and Cybernetics, Czech Technical University in Prague

- Read aloud

- EKOenergy ecolabel 

- Association Banlieue Santé - Opération #Enmodedeconfiné

- 91st International Session of the European Youth Parliament 

- Symbiosis

- Oltalom karitativ egyesület / Gabor IVANYI

- Keresztény társadalmi elvek a gazdaságban posztgraduális képzés / Laura Sarolta BARITZ (Post-graduate course in Christian Social Principles in the Economy)

- Irish Girl Guides Europe Badge

- Family Careers Ireland

- Le Voci della Memoria (Voices of Remembrance)

- Organizācijas "ManaBalss" - digitālās platformas pilsoniskajāi līdzdalībai

- Pizza4doctors

- #AllDagEngBA / #BitzDoheem

- Lockdown Festival 

- Stichting Geen Grens (No borders)

- Inicjatywa Wolne Sady (Free Courts Initiative)

- Education for active citizenship, youth empowerment and skills development

- Developing the Romanian National Child Cancer Registry

- Olympiáda ľudských práv (Human Rights Olympiad)

- Neighbourhood Solidarity Networks Somos Tribu VK (Puente de Vallecas) - We are tribe VK

- Yalla Trappan

2021 winners 

- eljub European Youth Encounters 

- Paars (Purple) 

- TheMayor.EU - The European Portal for Cities and Citizens 

- With One Dream United 

- Documentary films: ‘Our Wall’ and ‘My Homeland’ 

- Masaryk University Volunteer Centre MUNI HELPS 

- European Debate Initiative 

- Youth English Club 

- The volunteers (about 800) of the Crises Helpline 

- Franco-German citizens’ dialogue on strengthening cross-border cooperation 

- International Youth Theatre Festival ‘Wilde Mischung’ (‘Mad Mix’) in Schwäbisch Hall 

- ELEPAP Rehabilitation for those with disabilities 

- Emergency Exit operation – international educational cooperation 

- Too Into You campaign by Women's Aid 

- FROLLA Microbiscottificio micro biscuit factory 

- Activity to support residents of Belarus 

- Liene Dambina 

- Mano Guru 

- RespectEachOther 

- Monument of Mercy 

- Project Phoenix of Stichting AeroDelft 

- Defending the dignity and independence of judges fighting for judicial independence in Poland 

- UMP - Uniao das Misericórdias 

- Geofolk 

- Zmudri Civics stream 

- Kristina Modic and Dr Samo Zver – For solidarity and pan-European health progress for cancer patients 

- Villa de Moya volunteers for the reception and integration of illegal migrants 

- The Navet (‘Hub’) Association in Bergsjön and its Collaborative Creation Project

2022 winners  

- Civil courage – Initiative against the deportation of schoolgirls    

- My talents. for diversity

- The Coordination Centre of Promote Ukraine

- FUND 5.5

- OXYGONO (Cyprus Forum & Nomoplatform)

- Charita Znojmo’s humanitarian assistance to Ukraine 

- #HolkyzMarketingu      

- Europe Dialogue

- Assisting Ukraine and ‘Ukraina heaks!’ (For Ukraine) initiative

- InteRadional

- ApplicAid

- Doctors of the World - Greece: Emergency response to humanitarian crisis

- Miklós Both, folk song collector

- Jigsaw Pandemic Response

- Connect Migrant Youth 

- #siamotuttelaura                                                     
- Young people remember the Shoah – SOS UKRAINE   

- Hospiss LV

- BLUE/YELLOW

- Slava Ukrayini Luxembourg

- The Daphne Caruana Galizia Foundation

- News checkers (‘Nieuwscheckers’)

- José Andrés, the chef that feeds the refugees of the war in Ukraine 

- Volunteers Without Borders’ – refugees from Ukraine

- Tampinhas’ bottle cap project

- Support for refugee children from Ukraine

- Europe in a Cube (Kniha Európa v Kocke)

- Legal Network for the Protection of Democracy

- Customer Service in Bank Branches· ‘#SOY MAYOR, NO IDIOTA’           

- ANAR 116000 Helpline for missing children

See also

 List of awards for contributions to society

References

2008 establishments in the European Union
European awards
European Parliament
Governance and civic leadership awards
Orders, decorations, and medals of the European Union